is a former Japanese football player. She played for Japan national team.

Club career
Kubo was born in Osaka Prefecture on December 28, 1966. When she was junior high school student, she played for Takatsuki Ladies FC. The club won the 2nd place in 1979 Empress's Cup. When she was high school student, she played for Nishiyama High School Club. After graduating from high school, she returned to Takatsuki Ladies FC. When she was 23 years old, she got married and retired from playing career.

National team career
On September 6, 1981, when Kubo was 14 years and 262 days, she debuted for Japan national team against England. It made her the youngest player who represented Japan. She played 4 games for Japan until 1984.

National team statistics

References

1966 births
Living people
Association football people from Osaka Prefecture
Japanese women's footballers
Japan women's international footballers
Women's association footballers not categorized by position